James Goldstone (June 8, 1931 – November 5, 1999) was an American film and television director whose career spanned over thirty years.

Career
Goldstone was noted for the momentum and "fifteen-minute cliffhangers" that he brought to TV pilots such as Star Trek ("Where No Man Has Gone Before", 1966), Ironside, and The Bold Ones: The Senator. His later career helped pioneer the concept of "thirty-second attention span" pacing over detailed content in his dramatizations of Rita Hayworth, Calamity Jane, and the Kent State shootings for which he won the Emmy. He directed several feature films, including the large-scale suspense Rollercoaster (1977).

During his Hollywood career, he directed Paul Newman, Robert De Niro, George Segal, Robert Shaw, James Garner, Richard Dreyfuss and Sidney Poitier and collaborated with composer and musician, Lalo Schifrin.  He "discovered" Tiny Tim. In addition to his work in film and television, Goldstone was a longtime leader in the Director's and Writers Guilds.  In his later life, he taught both at Bennington College and in the masters program at Columbia University.  During the 1990s he directed a number of theatrical productions in New England. He was also central in the establishment of National Public Radio presence in Vermont and was the moving force behind the creation of the Vermont Arts Council which named its award for new talent the James Goldstone Award.

Goldstone was the son of Hollywood agent and early television producer, Jules Goldstone.

Partial filmography
The Outer Limits ("The Sixth Finger", TV, 1963, and "The Inheritors", TV, 1964)
Star Trek ("Where No Man Has Gone Before", TV, 1966)
A Man Called Gannon (1968)
Jigsaw (1968)
Shadow Over Elveron (1968)
Winning (1969)
Brother John (1971)
Red Sky at Morning (1971)
The Gang That Couldn't Shoot Straight (1971)
They Only Kill Their Masters (1972)
Things in Their Season (1974)
Swashbuckler (1976)
Eric (1976)
Rollercoaster (1977)
When Time Ran Out... (1980)
Kent State (1981)
Charles & Diana: A Royal Love Story (TV, 1982)
Rita Hayworth: The Love Goddess  (TV, 1983)
Calamity Jane (1984)
The Sun Also Rises (1984)
Dreams of Gold: The Mel Fisher Story
Earth Star Voyager (TV, 1988)
The Bride in Black (TV, 1990)

References

External links
 

 The Papers of James Goldstone in the Dartmouth College Library

1931 births
1999 deaths
American television directors
Primetime Emmy Award winners
Film directors from California
Kent State shootings